Antanas Sniečkus ( – 22 January 1974) was a Lithuanian communist politician who served as the First Secretary of the Communist Party of Lithuania from 15 August 1940 to 22 January 1974.

Biography
Sniečkus was born in 1903, in the village of Būbleliai, near Šakiai. During the First World War, his family fled to Russia where he observed the Russian revolution of 1917. In 1919, his family returned to Lithuania; by 1920 he was already a member of the Bolshevik Party. In the same year, he was arrested for anti-government activities. He was released from prison on bail, but fled to Moscow, and became an agent of the Comintern. In Moscow, he earned the trust of Zigmas Angarietis and Vincas Mickevičius-Kapsukas, and became a member of the Central Committee of the Communist Party of Lithuania. In 1926, the Comintern sent Sniečkus to Lithuania to replace the recently executed Karolis Požėla as head of the banned and underground Communist Party of Lithuania.

From 1926 to 1930, he engaged in subversive activities in Lithuania, and was again arrested and imprisoned for them in Kaunas Prison in 1930. In 1933, Sniečkus was released in exchange for Lithuanian political prisoners held in the USSR. In 1936, he returned to Lithuania. In 1939, he was arrested again, and sentenced to eight years in prison. After the 1940 Soviet ultimatum to Lithuania and subsequent military occupation, Sniečkus was released from prison on 18 June 1940, and became the head of the Department of National Security. Foreign Affairs Commissar Vladimir Dekanozov, arrived in Lithuania a few days earlier on 15 June, to organize the incorporation of Lithuania into the Soviet Union. As party secretary, Sniečkus issued Vladimir Dekanozov’s orders in the party’s name. Sniečkus helped create an atmosphere of terror prior to the elections of the newly established, by the Soviet authorities, People's Seimas, on 14 July. Only the Communist Party of Lithuania and its collaborators could nominate candidates. People were threatened in various ways to participate in the elections, but the results were falsified anyway. On 21 July, the People's Seimas, declared that the Lithuanian "people" wanted to join the Soviet Union, and on 3 August, the Supreme Soviet of the USSR annexed Lithuania into the Soviet Union. The illegal process of annexation was formally over and the Lithuanian Soviet Socialist Republic was created. From 15 August, until his death, Sniečkus was the most powerful man in Lithuania.

Sniečkus was the initiator of the first mass deportations of Lithuanians on 14–19 June 1941. He even had his own brother, with his family, deported to Siberia, where his brother died. When Soviet party chief Nikita Khrushchev issued an amnesty program, many political prisoners and deportees were released from prisons and labour camps, but Sniečkus did not allow them to return to Lithuania.

On 26 November 1942, the Lithuanian Partisan Movement (Lietuvos partizaninio judėjimo štabas) was created in Moscow, under the command of Sniečkus, who had retreated with the Red Army to Moscow, in 1941. The existence of the Command of Lithuanian Partisan Movement had to show the Lithuanian nature of Soviet partisans actions in Lithuania, but in reality groups of saboteurs sent from Moscow did not report to the Command of Lithuanian Partisan Movement and instead reported directly to the Central Command of the Partisan Movement. It is estimated that in Lithuania 5—10 thousand people engaged in Soviet underground activities during the war.

In 1944, due to the advance of the Red Army, his mother fled Lithuania to the West, and disowned her son. Two brothers and three sisters of Antanas Sniečkus also fled to the West. Sniečkus returned from Russia in 1944 with the Communist officials who had retreated during the German invasion of 22 June 1941.  

During the later decades of Sniečkus's rule, national orientation was noticeable in his activities. First confrontation with Moscow happened in 1949-1950, when he had to defend his old communist friends from persecution, with whom he was together working in underground. Lithuania was the only republic of USSR where not only mass persecution of old communists did not happen and not even one communist of pre-Soviet times was accused and arrested. At around this time his policies started to gain a national character. This policy had the form of sabotaging some orders of Moscow, demanding some privileges for Lithuania, and others.

His wife Mira Bordonaitė was also a convinced communist and spent many years in prison. Sniečkus had two children, Vladas and Marytė.

After his death
Sniečkus, a village for employees of the Ignalina Nuclear Power Plant on the shores of Lake Drūkšiai, was founded in 1975. In 1992 the town was renamed Visaginas and in 1995 received city rights.

Some attempts have been made in Lithuania to rehabilitate Sniečkus, who was more or less successfully mythologized throughout several decades.

See also
 Lithuanian partisans (1941)
 1940 Soviet ultimatum to Lithuania
 Occupation of the Baltic states
 Baltic states under Soviet rule

References

1903 births
1974 deaths
Burials at Antakalnis Cemetery
Central Committee of the Communist Party of the Soviet Union members
First Secretaries of the Communist Party of Lithuania
Heroes of Socialist Labour
Lithuanian communists
Lithuanian people of World War II
Members of the Supreme Soviet of the Lithuanian Soviet Socialist Republic
Members of the Supreme Soviet of the Soviet Union
People from Kovno Governorate
People from Šakiai District Municipality
People granted political asylum in the Soviet Union
Recipients of the Order of Lenin
Recipients of the Order of the Red Banner
Soviet people of World War II
Tiesa editors